Henri-François-Joseph de Régnier (28 December 1864 – 23 May 1936) was a French symbolist poet, considered one of the most important of France during the early 20th century.

Life and works
He was born in Honfleur (Calvados) on 28 December 1864, and educated in Paris for law. In 1885 he began to contribute to the Parisian reviews, and his verses were published by most of the French and Belgian periodicals favorable to the symbolist writers. Having begun as a Parnassian, he retained the classical tradition, though he adopted some of the innovations of Jean Moréas and Gustave Kahn. His vaguely suggestive style shows the influence  of Stéphane Mallarmé, of whom he was an assiduous disciple.

His first volume of poems, Lendemains, appeared in 1885, and among numerous later volumes are Poèmes anciens et romanesques (1890), Les Jeux rustiques et divins (1890), Les Médailles d'argile (1900), La Cité des eaux (1903). He is also the author of a series of realistic novels and tales, among which are La Canne de jaspe (2nd ed., 1897), La Double maîtresse (5th ed., 1900), Les Vacances d’un jeune homme sage (1903), and Les Amants singuliers (1905). Régnier married Marie de Heredia, daughter of the poet José María de Heredia, and herself a novelist and poet under the pen name of Gérard d'Houville.

He was a contributor to Le Visage de l'Italie, a 1929 book about Italy prefaced by Benito Mussolini.

La Canne de jaspe and Histoires Incertaines (1919) were translated in 2012 by Brian Stableford under the title A Surfeit of Mirrors 

Henri de Régnier died in 1936 at age 71 and was interred in the Père Lachaise Cemetery in Paris.

Other media 
An edition of Maurice Ravel's waltz Valses nobles et sentimentales was published with a quotation from de Régnier "…le plaisir délicieux et toujours nouveau d'une occupation inutile"
In the introductory cutscene to the 2012 video game Dragon's Dogma, by Capcom, the quotation  "le plaisir délicieux... d'une occupation inutile" (subtitled trans. "The delightful and ever-novel pleasure of a useless occupation.") is given and attributed to de Régnier himself.

Film 
 2019 : Curiosa, Lou Jeunet's French movie.

References

External links
 
 

1864 births
1936 deaths
People from Honfleur
Collège Stanislas de Paris alumni
19th-century French poets
20th-century French poets
Writers from Normandy
Symbolist poets
French ballet librettists
French horror writers
Members of the Académie Française
Grand Officiers of the Légion d'honneur
Burials at Père Lachaise Cemetery